Atete is a fertility goddess worshipped at Kafa (Ethiopia). 

It is probably the subject of an ancient fertility rite performed by women who collect various sacred plants and throw them into the river.

References 

African goddesses
Fertility goddesses